Odites pancyclia is a moth in the family Depressariidae. It was described by Edward Meyrick in 1928. It is found on Luzon in the Philippines.

References

Moths described in 1928
Odites
Taxa named by Edward Meyrick